Ferdinand-Jean Darier (26 April 1856 – 1938) was a French physician, pathologist and dermatologist called the "father of modern dermatology in France".

Career

Medical
Born in Pest, Hungary to French parents, Darier studied with Louis-Antoine Ranvier (1835–1922) at the Collège de France.

Darier discovered several diseases, most notably Darier's disease, a peculiar figurate erythema, which he identified in 1889 as psorodermose folliculaire végétante. The other diseases were a follicular keratosis (Darier-White syndrome), acanthosis nigricans, dermatofibrosarcoma (Darier-Ferrand disease), erythema annularis, subcutaneous sarcoidosis (Darier-Roussy sarcoid), and a sign, Darier's sign observed in mastocytosis.

From 1909 to 1922, Darier was head of the clinical department at the Hôpital Saint-Louis. He was one of the "big five" of the Paris School of Dermatology, along with Ernest Henri Besnier (1831–1909), Louis-Anne-Jean Brocq (1856–1928), Raymond Sabouraud (1864–1938) and Jean Alfred Fournier (1832–1915).

Darier wrote the dermatology textbook Précis de dermatologie, which was published in 1909 and translated into Spanish, German and English. He was also the editor of the dermatological encyclopedia Nouvelle Pratique Dermatologique, which was published in eight volumes, beginning in 1936.

Political
Besides his medical activities, Darier was the mayor of the town Longpont-sur-Orge from 1925 to 1935.

List of works 
 De l’artérite syphilitique (1904)
 Précis de dermatologie (1909)
 Nouvelle Pratique Dermatologique (1936)

Sources 

1856 births
1938 deaths
French dermatologists
French pathologists
Physicians from Budapest